Marc Gouiffe à Goufan (born 12 April 1984) is a Cameroonian former professional footballer who played as a defender.

Career
Gouiffe à Goufan made his debut on the professional league level in the 2. Bundesliga for SC Paderborn 07 on 7 August 2005 when he came on as a substitute in the 67th minute in a game against SpVgg Unterhaching.

References

External links
 
 

1984 births
Living people
Cameroonian footballers
Association football defenders
Cameroon international footballers
2. Bundesliga players
Moldovan Super Liga players
SC Paderborn 07 players
FC St. Pauli players
VfL Wolfsburg II players
SV Eintracht Trier 05 players
FC Rapid Ghidighici players
Cameroonian expatriate footballers
Cameroonian expatriate sportspeople in Germany
Expatriate footballers in Germany
Cameroonian expatriate sportspeople in Moldova
Expatriate footballers in Moldova
Cameroonian expatriate sportspeople in Switzerland
Expatriate footballers in Switzerland